Ek Je Chhilo Raja is an Indian Bengali drama film directed by Srijit Mukherji, under the banner of SVF Entertainment Pvt Ltd, starring Jisshu Sengupta in the titular role of Maharaja Mahendra Kumar Chowdhury as well as the Bhawal sanyasi. The film also stars Jaya Ahsan, Aparna Sen, Anirban Bhattacharya, Anjan Dutt, Rudranil Ghosh and Sreenanda Shankar. The movie was released during Durga puja 2018. 
Most of the film was shot at Kathgola in Murshidabad. The film won the National Film Award for Best Feature Film in Bengali at India's 66th National Film Awards.

Plot
The movie is based on the Bhawal case, an extended Indian court case about a possible impostor who claimed to be the prince of Bhawal, who was presumed dead a decade earlier.

Cast

 Jisshu Sengupta as Raja Mahendra Kumar Chowdhury
 Jaya Ahsan as Mrinmayee Debi
 Anirban Bhattacharya as Satya Banerjee
 Anjan Dutta as Lawyer Bhaskar Mukherjee
 Aparna Sen as Lawyer Anupama Basu
 Rudranil Ghosh as Doctor Ashwini Dasgupta
 Rajnandini Paul as Chandravati Devi
 Barun Chanda as The Judge
 Alexx O'Nell as Rankin
 Sreenanda Shankar as Kadambari (Baiji)

Soundtrack

Release and reception 
Ek Je Chhilo Raja released on 12 October 2018. Bengali newspaper Anandabazar Patrika wrote in their review that Jisshu Sengupta performance was one of the best portrayals in his career. They also praised the performance by Jaya Ahsan.

Awards

66th National Film Awards 
Best Feature Film in Bengali - Ek Je Chhilo Raja

References

External links
 

Bengali-language Indian films
2010s Bengali-language films
Films directed by Srijit Mukherji
Indian drama films
Films about royalty
Indian courtroom films
Films about death
Best Bengali Feature Film National Film Award winners